Jonathan Granoff is an American lawyer, screenwriter and lecturer, widely known as President of the Global Security Institute.

Granoff is a Senior Advisor of the American Bar Association's Committee on Arms Control and National Security and has served as Vice President of the NGO Committee on Disarmament at the United Nations.  He serves on numerous governing and advisory boards including the Lawyers Committee on Nuclear Policy, the Lawyers Alliance for World Security, the Jane Goodall Institute, the Bipartisan Security Group, and the Middle Powers Initiative.

Granoff has lectured worldwide on the legal, ethical and spiritual dimensions of human development and security, with a specific focus on the threats posed by nuclear weapons.  As a screenwriter, Granoff has been featured in more than 30 publications.

He has practiced law in Philadelphia as an individual practitioner, in several medium-sized firms, and as in-house counsel in a public company. He chaired the special session on Terrorism and Threats to Humanity at the Summit of Nobel Peace Laureates in Rome in 2004, where he represented the International Peace Bureau, a Nobel Peace Laureate organization. Granoff has represented the International Peace Bureau at the Nobel Peace Laureate Summits in Rome every year since 2002.

Background
Granoff is the son of singer Kitty Kallen — widely known for her 1954 chart-topping solo recording '"Little Things Mean a Lot" — and pioneering television syndicator Bernard "Budd" Granoff (1920-1996).

Granoff received his Baccalaureate degree, Cum Laude, from Vassar College and Juris Doctor from Rutgers School of Law - Camden.

Speeches and writings
Selected speeches and writings by Mr. Jonathan Granoff:

May 5, 2010, New York City:  presented at "Principles, Values and Global Security," seminar organized by Religions for Peace.

April 19, 2010, Tehran, Iran:  presentation delivered at the International Conference on Nuclear Non-proliferation and Disarmament, sponsored by the Iranian Ministry of Foreign Affairs.

December 5, 2009, Hiroshima, Japan:  presented at the symposium, "Hiroshima Strives for Nuclear Abolition: Pursuing measures to energize the 2010 NPT Review Conference," organized by the Hiroshima Peace Institute and Chugoku Shimbun.

Cambridge Scholars Press.

References

External links
Global Security Institute
Lawyers Committee on Nuclear Policy 
Lawyers Alliance for World Security
Bipartisan Security Group
Middle Powers Initiative
Disarmament and Peace Education- Writings

American lawyers
Living people
American anti–nuclear weapons activists
Vassar College alumni
Rutgers University alumni
Year of birth missing (living people)